Nils Jørgen "Jøgge" Kaalstad (born 23 January 1979 in Bærum) is a Norwegian actor and musician who performs under the stage name Sideshow Jøgge. He is best known to international audiences as Dag Solstad from Lilyhammer and Arvid from Norsemen, both shown on Netflix.

Career

Acting
Nils Jørgen Kaalstad was a child actor in Bærum Children's Theater between the years 1985 and 1997. At the same time, he appeared in various short films, as well as playing the roles of Olaf in Henrik Ibsen's The Pillars of Society and Anton in Det Lykkelige Valg at the National Theatre in 1992 and 1993, respectively.

He graduated from the Norwegian National Academy of Theatre in the spring of 2007.
Since January 2009, he has been permanently employed as an actor at the National Theatre.

From 2012 to 2014, Kaalstad had a recurring role on the Netflix show Lilyhammer about a former New York gangster trying to start a new life in Lillehammer, Norway.
In 2016, he landed a major role in the Netflix comedy series Norsemen, a parody of Viking life and customs. He kept the role for the duration of the show's three seasons, until March 2020.

In 2019, Kaalstad received the Hedda Award in the category Best Male Actor for his role in the play Uten navn - Å miste sine nærmeste by Mattis Herman Nyquist and Fredrik Høyer.

Music
Kaalstad performs as an electronic musician under the stage name Sideshow Jøgge, often with collaborator Olav Brekke Mathisen. They have made a number of music videos for other artists such as Snuten and King Midas, as well as commercials, including for Quart Festival 2005. The duo released the album N*A*O*M*B (Nugatti All Ova Me Butty) in 2003.

Personal life
In 2018, Kaalstad married actress Marian Saastad Ottesen, who also stars in Lilyhammer and Norsemen.

Selected filmography

References

External links
 

1979 births
Norwegian male child actors
Musicians from Bærum
Norwegian electronic musicians
21st-century Norwegian male actors
Norwegian male television actors
Norwegian male film actors
Living people